The Sutton Loop Line, also known as the Wimbledon Loop, is a railway line that diverges from the Portsmouth Line at Streatham South junction and rejoins it near Sutton station. 
The short section between  station and West junction is known as the "Wall of Death", possibly due to the very steep concrete walls to the cutting on both sides and the sharpness of the curve which resemble the motorcycle ride at a funfair.

Stations
In a clockwise direction round the loop, the stations are:

 Sutton

Infrastructure
Traction current is supplied at 750 volts DC via the third rail. The supply for this is overseen by Selhurst Electrical Control Room. Signalling is Track Circuit Block with multiple aspect colour light signals, controlled from Three Bridges rail operating centre. The line is double track throughout, except where a short bi-directionally signalled single line section passes through Wimbledon station platform 9. Originally the Down St Helier Line used platform 10 at Wimbledon, but this is now used for the Tramlink terminus which currently comprises a single platform at the southern end, split into two sections so two trams can be held at the same time.

History

Services

Thameslink
Thameslink runs services from St Albans, via  round the loop. Clockwise services are described as "Sutton via Mitcham Junction" and anti-clockwise as "Sutton via Wimbledon".  Occasionally, during service disruption or when the core section of the Thameslink route is closed, Sutton Loop services start and end at  'low level' station (i.e. the terminating platforms, 10–15).

Recent proposals were to increase the frequency of the Thameslink service by terminating at Blackfriars. This would have allowed the trains through the core section to be replaced with longer trains which could not use the loop, but this did not proceed due to objections from loop passengers about the withdrawal of their through service.

References

Railway lines in London
Railway loop lines
Transport in the London Borough of Merton
Transport in the London Borough of Sutton